is a railway station in the city of Gujō, Gifu Prefecture, Japan, operated by the third sector railway operator Nagaragawa Railway.

Lines

Station layout
Tokunaga Station has one ground-level side platform serving a single bi-directional track. The station is unattended.

Adjacent stations

History
Tokunaga Station was opened on March 1, 1955. Operations were transferred from the Japan National Railway (JNR) to the Nagaragawa Railway on December 11, 1986.

Surrounding area
Nagara River

Yamato Post Office

See also
 List of Railway Stations in Japan

References

External links

 

Railway stations in Japan opened in 1955
Railway stations in Gifu Prefecture
Stations of Nagaragawa Railway
Gujō, Gifu